Konrad McKay (born December 15, 1979) is a Canadian former professional ice hockey player. Between 2001 and 2004 he played 170 games in the ECHL with the Charlotte Checkers.

Awards and honours

References

External links

1979 births
Living people
Bridgeport Sound Tigers players
Canadian ice hockey centres
Charlotte Checkers (1993–2010) players
Hartford Wolf Pack players
Ice hockey people from Manitoba
OCN Blizzard players
New Mexico Scorpions (CHL) players
North Bay Centennials players
Odessa Jackalopes players
People from Northern Region, Manitoba
Verdun Dragons players
Canadian expatriate ice hockey players in the United States